Atariya is a village in the Hardoi district of the Indian state of Uttar Pradesh. Atariya village is situated 48 km away from district headquarter Hardoi.

Geography
Atariya is situated to the north of Mahmudpur village.

Demographics
As of 2011 Indian Census, Atariya had a total population of 437, of which 248 were males and 189 were females. Population within the age group of 0 to 6 years was 62. The total number of literates in Atariya was 201, which constituted 46% of the population with male literacy of 54.8% and female literacy of 35.4%. The effective literacy rate of 7+ population of Bahraich was 53.6%, of which male literacy rate was 61.5% and female literacy rate was 42.2%. The sex ratio is 762 females for 1000 males. Atariya had 63 households in 2011.

References

Villages in Hardoi district